Chronology is the debut studio album by Jamaican reggae musician Chronixx. It was released in July 2017 under Virgin EMI Records.

The album was up for nomination for Best Reggae Album at the 60th Annual Grammy Awards

Track listing

Charts

References

2017 debut albums